Polish Cemetery in Bandar-e Anzali is a cemetery in Bandar-e Anzali northern Iran. It was made during Evacuation of Polish civilians from the USSR in World War II. This war cemetery contains the remains of 163 graves of the Polish soldiers of the Anders' Army and 476 graves of the Polish civilians who perished due to sickness during their transport to the Middle East, for a total of 639 graves. Bandar-e Anzali is the port where the Polish Anders' Army disembarked, in an operation that lasted from April 1, 1942 until October 1942, after evacuating from the USSR.

Overview

At the center of the cemetery stands a high rectangular column of white marble which is engraved with a Polish eagle. Below it, in English and Polish, are inscribed the words: 

The cemetery also has a street gate, with the large inscription CMENTARZ POLSKI, but it is closed with a padlock. On the gate, a worn Persian–language plaque announces that burials took place here between 1939 and 1945. It can be accessed only from the Armenian graveyard, and a low wall separates the two cemeteries. Rows of graves are lined up on both sides of the monument, each with 18 concrete headstones showing the names of the deceased, their dates of birth and death, and also the ranks of the soldiers. If they were unknown, they were marked as "Nieznany" (Polish: "unknown,") of whom only the date of death was known.

Gallery

See also
 Polish Cemetery at Monte Cassino
 Polish Military Cemetery at Casamassima

References

External links
 Location Map of the Polish Cemetery @ Bandar-e Anzali
 An article about the Polish Cemetery in Bandar-e Anzali @ Iranian.com.
 Polish Cemeteries in Iran @ Embassy of the Republic of Poland in Tehran, Iran Website.
 An Article about the Polish Cemetery @ Bandar-e Anzali called "Polish Cemetery on the Caspian Shore"

World War II cemeteries
Cemeteries in Iran
Poland in World War II
Iran–Poland relations
Gilan Province